Wearde is a southeastern suburb of Saltash in Cornwall, England, UK.

References

Populated places in Cornwall